The 2009 Southern 500 presented by GoDaddy.com, the 53rd running of the race which its lineage dates to the 1957 Rebel 300  and was the first year the Rebel was given the name of the then-suspended fall race , was the eleventh race of the NASCAR Sprint Cup season, was held on Saturday, May 9, 2009 at Darlington Speedway in Darlington, South Carolina.

The race was televised in the USA on Fox starting at 7 PM US EDT with radio being handled on MRN on terrestrial radio and Sirius Satellite Radio.

Seventy-two thousand fans were eyewitnesses to four hours and eleven minutes of racing action. There were 23 changes to the lead position recorded during the race and 17 cautions were taken for a duration of 73 laps. Almost 20% of the race was held under the caution flag due to debris and accidents while the average green flag run was slightly more than 16 laps.

Failed to Qualify: Jeremy Mayfield (#41), Scott Speed (#82)
Note: Scott Speed's team paid Joe Nemechek to let Speed drive his car in this race.

References

Southern 500
Southern 500
NASCAR races at Darlington Raceway
May 2009 sports events in the United States